Emilia Figueroa (born 11 September 1953) is a Uruguayan former swimmer. She competed in six events at the 1968 Summer Olympics.

References

1953 births
Living people
Uruguayan female swimmers
Olympic swimmers of Uruguay
Swimmers at the 1968 Summer Olympics
Sportspeople from Montevideo